Vladimir Aleksandrovich Chechulin (born 18 June 1988) is a former Russian professional football player.

Club career
He played two seasons in the Russian Football National League for FC SKA Rostov-on-Don.

External links
 
 

1988 births
Living people
Russian footballers
Association football midfielders
FC SKA Rostov-on-Don players
FC Taganrog players
FC Mashuk-KMV Pyatigorsk players
Sportspeople from Sochi